On Friday 28 February 1992, the Provisional IRA (IRA) exploded a bomb inside London Bridge station during the morning rush hour, causing extensive damage and wounding 29 people. It was one of many bombings carried out by one of the IRA's London active service units. It occurred just over a year after a bomb at Victoria station.

Bombing
Around 8:20 am, someone rang Ulster Television's London office warning that a bomb was going to explode in a London station, without saying which one. Twenty nine people were hurt in the explosion, most of them from flying glass and other bits of debris; four were seriously hurt but nobody was killed. The victims were treated at Guy's Hospital.

Aftermath
The head of Scotland Yard's anti terrorist squad, George Churchill-Coleman, said the  bomb of high explosives was "clearly designed to kill." Investigations suggested that the bomb was placed in the men's restrooms. Churchill-Coleman added that the IRA's warning was "deliberately vague" and was given too late to act upon.

Prime Minister John Major said the bombing would not change British policy in Northern Ireland. "It was pointless. It was cowardly. It was directed against innocent people and it will make absolutely no difference to our policy -- no difference at all."

The next day, another bomb went off in London, by the Crown Prosecution Service office, injuring two more people and bringing the total injured to 31 in the space of just over 24 hours.

This was one of dozens of bombs that detonated in London that year, the biggest of which was the Baltic Exchange bombing, killing three people and causing almost £1 billion worth of damage. The IRA maintained this pressure, bombing mainland Britain and especially the city of London as much as possible until the ceasefire of 1994.

See also
Chronology of Provisional Irish Republican Army actions (1992–1999)
Victoria station and Paddington station bombings
Cannon Street train bombing

References

Explosions in 1992
1992 in London
Terrorist incidents in London in the 1990s
Provisional IRA bombings in London
Car and truck bombings in London
Attacks on buildings and structures in 1992
Attacks on buildings and structures in London
1992 crimes in the United Kingdom
February 1992 events in the United Kingdom
History of the London Borough of Southwark
20th century in the London Borough of Southwark
Building bombings in London